Mainstream Outlawz is the fourth studio album of the hip hop group X-Clan. The album consists of 14 tracks and it features artists such Bun B and Supernatural.

Track listing
"Down By Law"
"Night 2 Day"
"Thru My Eyez" (featuring Tony Henry & Bun B)
"Prime-Time Lyrics"
"The Lord Spits"
"Piper's Poetry"
"Orientation"
"Still Up in the Game" (featuring Poppa Doc & J-Napp)
"They Wanna Know"
"Do it Like You?!" (featuring Bobby Fine)
"Keys to Ur City" (featuring Medusa)
"Wiz Degrees"
"Armageddon DNA" (featuring Phoenix Orion & Supernatural)
"Stop, Look, Recognize"

References

2009 albums
X Clan albums
Suburban Noize Records albums
Political music albums by American artists